Battlecross was an American heavy metal band from Canton, Michigan. The band has described their sound as "Blue Collar Thrash Metal". To date, they have released three albums through their label, Metal Blade Records.

History 
The band was founded in 2003 by Tony Asta and Hiran Deraniyagala in Canton, MI, where the childhood best friends and neighbors formed the earliest beginnings of Battlecross while attending Salem High School. Various members came and went. In 2006, vocalist Marshall Wood was hired who brought a new level of aggression ultimately altering the vocal direction of the band. In 2007, drummer Mike Kreger was hired. In 2008 and 2010 respectively, bassist Don Slater and singer Kyle "Gumby" Gunther joined the band, after Marshall's departure for family reasons. Together, they played local shows around Detroit and in the Midwest and opened for such acts as Dying Fetus, GWAR, DevilDriver, The Absence, Vital Remains, and The Faceless.

Pursuit of Honor (2011) 

In 2010, Battlecross self-released their debut album Push Pull Destroy. In late 2010, the band caught the eye of Metal Blade Records while members were replacing their vocalist, Marshall Wood. The band tapped Kyle "Gumby" Gunther of the Flint, MI-area band and management roster mate, I Decay, to front the band. Gunther stepped in to re-record the album and rewrote the track Aiden, renaming it Kaleb after his newborn son. The re-recorded album, Pursuit of Honor, was released in August 2011 by Metal Blade Records and was recorded at Random Awesome Recording Studio in Bay City, Michigan and produced by Josh Schroeder.

Pursuit of Honor produced three singles. "Push Pull Destroy", "Man of Stone" and "Breaking You", which combined spent 50 weeks on SiriusXM Liquid Metal 'Devil's Dozen' list of most requested songs, with 'Push Pull Destroy' at the #1 spot for five weeks in Spring 2012. The accompanying video has racked up more than 1.8 million views on YouTube: https://www.youtube.com/watch?v=miZLob1Hi4I and was the break-out track for these high-energy thrashers.

War of Will (2013) 

In early 2013, the band announced that they will enter the studio in March to record their follow-up to their 2011 Metal Blade debut Pursuit of Honor, The band will begin tracking immediately after the "Another Year, Another Tour" with In Flames, Demon Hunter and All Shall Perish for 27 North American dates. Eyal Levi will handle engineering duties on the record and Armored Saint’s Joey Vera, who mastered the band's cover version of Pantera’s "Fucking Hostile", will master.

Lewis, responsible for the production and/or engineering for bands such as The Black Dahlia Murder, Trivium, DevilDriver and Deicide, said: "I can't wait to be a part of BATTLECROSS' next record. From the moment I heard the band I knew I wanted to be a part of their development. Hearing the new music has only solidified that feeling. Working with our good friends at Metal Blade and bringing great new music to the masses is what it's all about."

According to statements made in the press, Metal Blade records President Michael Faley stated that the record would be released in time for the band's appearance on the Rockstar Energy Drink Mayhem Festival in July 2013.

In April 2013, the band's label issued a press release announcing that drummer Shannon Lucas, formerly of All That Remains and The Black Dahlia Murder, served as the session drummer on the newest Battlecross album, to be released in Summer of 2013.

The new album's first single "Force Fed Lies" was released and made available for digital download on May 29, 2013.

Departure of Michael Kreger 
In 2013, it was reported that drummer Michael Kreger had left the band to attend to personal business. Kevin Talley of Six Feet Under was announced as the touring drummer for the band for their New England Metal and Hardcore Festival and Orion Music + More appearances.

Talley, who has also played with Dååth, Chimaira, Misery Index, Nothnegal and Dying Fetus, said: "I'm stoked to play these shows with such an energetic and impressive band like BATTLECROSS. I had a chance to see them play on Trespass America and at the Scion A/V Metal Blade anniversary show and was blown away! New England Metal and Hardcore Festival and Orion Music + More are huge opportunities for the band and I'm honored to fill in behind the kit; they are definitely one of my favorite new bands!"

Drummer changes and 2014 

Following the departure of Michael Kreger, the band has gone through a cycle of touring drummers. Kevin Talley, formerly of Chimaira filled in for the 2013 Rockstar Energy Drink Mayhem Festival. Following the tour, and a show at GWARBQ 2014, Talley stepped down. When the band hit the road with Hatebreed, Shadows Fall, and The Acacia Strain for a fall 2013 tour, drummer Adam Pierce of All Shall Perish stepped in behind the kit for the band.

In 2014, Adam stepped down as the band's drummer, and in stepped session drummer from "War of Will" Shannon Lucas. Lucas, already familiar with the material, fit the slot perfectly. He stepped in and stuck with the band up until summer 2014.

During 2014, Battlecross saw a rise in popularity, hitting many tours along the way, including 2 tours in Europe, including a slot on the renown Download Festival held in Donington Park. While in Europe, the band hit many smaller venues with fellow Mayhem Festival tour mates Huntress. Following a return to the States, Battlecross wasted no time in hitting the road again across America, in direct support of Canadian metallers Protest the Hero. During the tour, the band got a much needed exposure increase from being on a bill with such a different style of metal. This spike in popularity led to a small headlining tour over the Summer. But it would come at the cost of drummer Shannon Lucas, who withdrew from the band after the Protest the Hero tour. However, the band quickly had a replacement in the wings, filling the kit position with drummer Alex Bent. Bent completed the headlining tour, which was Battlecross' first headline tour, with support from Ikillya. Canadian metal band Crimson Shadows were also supposed to be on the tour, but encountered problems getting access to the States. The tour also included a stop at Dirt Fest 2014.

On August 20, Battlecross will hit the stage in Mexico City, their first concert in the country, in support of Black Label Society. Following the show, they will then set off on a small South American tour in support of Killswitch Engage and Memphis May Fire. They will then return to the States for a fall tour opening for Machine Head, Children of Bodom, and Epica. The tour will also include a stop at Fillmageddon in Silver Spring, MD.

The band also looked to close 2014 with a rumored entry into the studio to start the recording of their third studio album and follow up to War of Will.

Rise to Power , departure of Alex Bent (2015–present) and indefinite hiatus 

On May 27, 2015, the band released a new single entitled "Not Your Slave", and revealed the title of their upcoming studio album as Rise to Power.

Alex Bent left the band in 2015 and was replaced with Brian Zink.

In April 2016, the ensemble toured with Soulfly, Abnormality, Suffocation and Lody Kong.

In October to November 2016, Battlecross went on tour with Soilwork and Unearth and announced a headlining tour with Allegaeon in support.

In January 2019, the ensemble indicated that they were working on new material.

In 2022, the band announced their annual “Battle Christmas” show would take place on December 9. They revealed the show would be their last "for the foreseeable future" and the band will then go on indefinite hiatus.

Reviews 
Pursuit of Honor received accolades from music reviewers from across the globe. In many reviews, the album referenced the band's promise to rival the Big Four of Metal and perhaps one of the best albums on the modern thrash metal scene. The band and the debut also drew comparisons to metal groove heavy-weights Pantera and Lamb of God, with Metal Assault naming the record "one of the most 'complete' heavy metal albums in recent times" and "bristling with fist-pumping, face-melting heavy metal at its finest."

Oft-critical website Blabbermouth reviewed the album as "easily one of the better metal debuts of 2011", stating that "Pursuit of Honor will leave you breathless, maybe even skinless" and giving the album an '8' rating. The website described the album as "traditional thrash metal, but not in a retro wannabe sense, and is delivered in a package that is modern, yet avoids being too cookie-cutter; melodic, yet not 'pretty' or cleanly sung. Death metal heaviness with compositional skill, 'Pursuit of Honor' is above all else inanely energized."

Touring

Members

Final lineup 
 Tony Asta – lead guitar (2003–2022)
 Hiran Deraniyagala – rhythm guitar (2003–2022)
 Don Slater – bass (2008–2022)
 Kyle "Gumby" Gunther – vocals (2010–2022)
 Brian Zink – drums (2015–2022)

Former 
 Jay Saling – vocals, bass (2003–2006)
 Jason Leone – drums (2003–2007)
 Marshall Wood – vocals (2006–2010)
 Mike Kreger – drums (2007–2013)
 Mike Heugel – bass (2007–2008)
 Shannon Lucas – drums (2013–2014)
 Alex Bent – drums (2014–2015)

Live 
 Josean Orta – drums (2012)
 Adam Pierce – drums (2013)
 Kevin Talley – drums (2013)
 Joe Cady – lead guitar (2015)

Timeline

Discography

Studio albums

Demos

Singles

Videos

References

External links 

 
 Battlecross on Metal Blade Records
 

Death metal musical groups from Michigan
American thrash metal musical groups
Heavy metal musical groups from Michigan
Musical groups established in 2003
Musical quintets
Metal Blade Records artists